Helen Freeman (August 3, 1886 – December 25, 1960) was an American actress.

Biography
She was born as Helen Freeman in St. Louis, Missouri to Benjamin N. Freeman, a banker. In 1932, she married Edwin Corle in Ensenada, Mexico.

She died on December 25, 1960, in Los Angeles, California, and was interred at Grand View Memorial Park Cemetery in Glendale, California.

Filmography

References

External links

 Bio at IMdB
 Helen Freeman; IBDb.com
 Helen Freeman portrait (University of Washington, Sayre collection)

1886 births
1960 deaths
American film actresses
20th-century American actresses
Actresses from St. Louis
Burials at Grand View Memorial Park Cemetery